Vimol Jankam is a former professional footballer from Thailand.

Honours
Thailand U23
 2002 Asian Games: 4th Place with Thailand national under-23 football team
''Osotsapa
 Thai Premier League: Runner-up (2002,2006) Third Place (2004, 2005)
 Queen's Cup:  Champions (2002, 2003, 2004)
 Thailand FA Cup: Runners up (1999)
 Kor Royal Cup: Champions (2002, 2007)
 Thailand Premier League 2003/04 Top Scorer (14 Goals)

References

 Official team website

Living people
Vimol Jankam
1979 births
Expatriate footballers in Vietnam
Thai expatriate sportspeople in Vietnam
Thai expatriate footballers
Vimol Jankam
Vimol Jankam
Hoang Anh Gia Lai FC players
V.League 1 players
Vimol Jankam
Vimol Jankam
Association football forwards
Footballers at the 2002 Asian Games
Vimol Jankam